The 2021 Danish Individual Speedway Championship was the 2021 edition of the Danish Individual Speedway Championship. As in 2020, the final was staged over a single round at the Vojens Speedway Center. For the second year in a row, the title was won by Anders Thomsen for the second successive year, who beat Nicki Pedersen, Leon Madsen and Kenneth Bjerre.

Event format 
Each rider competed in five rides, with the four top scorers racing in an additional heat. The points from the additional heat were then added to the previous score from the five riders. The winner was the rider who accumulated the most points in all of their rides, and not the rider who won the additional heat.

Final 

{| width=100%
|width=50% valign=top|
9 June 2021
 Vojens

References 

Denmark
Speedway in Denmark
2021 in Danish motorsport